The 1907 World Chess Championship was a chess match contested between reigning world champion Emanuel Lasker of Germany, and challenger Frank J. Marshall of the United States, for the world chess championship. Lasker defended his title in dominant fashion, holding Marshall winless throughout the series, while winning eight games and drawing seven.

Background
Lasker had played little chess since retaining the World Championship in 1896–1897, in part due to his doctoral studies in mathematics. However, Lasker agreed to defend his title against American challenger Frank Marshall from January 26 to April 6, 1907, in the United States, with the games being played in New York, Philadelphia, Washington, D.C., Baltimore, Chicago, and Memphis. Lasker won the first three games, then scored one win and seven draws in games 4-11 before winning the last four games.

Results

Conditions
The first player to win eight games would be World Champion.

Match
{| class="wikitable" style="text-align:center"
|+World Chess Championship Match 1907
|-
! !! 1 !! 2 !! 3 !! 4 !! 5 !! 6 !! 7 !! 8 !! 9 !! 10 !! 11 !! 12 !! 13 !! 14 !! 15 !! Wins !! Total
|-
| align=left | 
| 0 ||style="background:black; color:white"| 0 || 0 ||style="background:black; color:white"| = || = ||style="background:black; color:white"| = || = ||style="background:black; color:white"| 0 || = ||style="background:black; color:white"| = || = ||style="background:black; color:white"| 0 || 0 || style="background:black; color:white"| 0 || 0 || 0 || 3½
|-
| align=left | 
|style="background:black; color:white"| 1 || 1 ||style="background:black; color:white"| 1 || = ||style="background:black; color:white"| = || = ||style="background:black; color:white"| = || 1 ||style="background:black; color:white"| = || = || style="background:black; color:white"| = || 1 ||style="background:black; color:white"| 1 || 1 ||style="background:black; color:white"| 1 || 8 || 11½
|}

Lasker retained his title.

External links
Source

1907
1907 in chess
1907 in the United States
Chess in the United States
Sports competitions in Chicago
Sports competitions in New York City
Sports in Philadelphia
Sports competitions in Baltimore
Sports in Memphis, Tennessee